Shajarur Kanta (Lit: The Quill of the Porcupine) is a Bengali mystery novel written by Sharadindu Bandyopadhyay in 1967.  The murderer kills people using porcupine quills thrust from behind into the heart.

Characters
Byomkesh Bakshi
Ajit Bandyopadhyay
Satyabati
Debasish Bhatto
Deepa Bhatto, wife of Debashish
Udaymadhab Mukherjee, grandfather of Deepa and Bijoy
Neelmadhab Mukherjee, father of Deepa and Bijoy
Prabal Gupta, lover of Deepa
Sujan Mitra, an actor
Nripati Laha

Bijoy Madhab Mukherjee, brother of Deepa 
Kharag Bahadur, footballer
Kapil Bose
Mother of Deepa and Bijoy
Dr. Sen
Dr. Gupta

Adaptations

Television
 This was one of the stories in the 1993 TV series Byomkesh Bakshi titled "Sahi Ka Kanta", that were recreated for broadcasting on Doordarshan, the Indian National Network, by Basu Chatterjee, and immediately went on to become one of the most memorable episodes.
 The story adapted into another TV series in 2014 named Byomkesh, which aired on the Bengali channel ETV Bangla.

Film
 A film of the same name was made in 1974.
 Another version of the film is made in 2015 with the same name.

Web series
 This story was adapted for season 3 of the web series, Bomkyesh, by Anirban Bhattacharya. https://en.m.wikipedia.org/wiki/Byomkesh_(web_series)

References

1967 novels
Indian Bengali-language novels
Indian mystery novels
Detective novels
Culture of Kolkata
1967 Indian novels
Byomkesh Bakshi